Derek Grier is an American politician serving as a Republican member of the Missouri House of Representatives, representing the state's 100th House district.

Career
Grier graduated from Principia College with a B.A. in business administration, and works in the real estate industry.

Grier is known for promoting professional licensing reform. He also advocated for improvement of rural healthcare in the wake of the COVID-19 pandemic.

References

Living people
21st-century American politicians
Principia College alumni
Republican Party members of the Missouri House of Representatives
Year of birth missing (living people)